

Major sports - team 
List of American football video games
List of association football video games
List of Australian rules football video games
List of baseball video games
List of basketball video games
List of cricket video games
List of ice hockey video games
List of rugby league video games
List of rugby union video games
List of volleyball video games

Major sports - individual 
List of fighting games
List of sumo video games
List of licensed professional wrestling video games
List of golf video games
List of racing video games
List of snowboarding video games
List of skateboarding video games

Other
 Olympic video games

See also

Sports video game

External links

Sports video games
sports